Goran Lovre (Serbian Cyrillic: Горан Ловре; born 23 March 1982) is a Serbian former professional footballer who played as a midfielder.

Club career
After playing five seasons for Anderlecht, Lovre signed a two-year deal with Groningen in the 2006 summer transfer window, with a possibility of a two-year extension. He spent four years in the Netherlands, making near 130 Eredivisie appearances and scoring 23 goals.

On 28 May 2010, Lovre signed a two-year deal with the English Championship side Barnsley. He scored his first goal for the club in a 3–1 win over Ipswich Town, where he was influential in the middle of the park, getting an assist. On 7 December 2011, his contract with Barnsley was terminated by mutual consent after featuring very little under new manager Keith Hill.

In June 2012, Serbian press reported that he might sign a contract with Partizan, the club where he started playing football. On 9 June 2012, Lovre signed a two-year contract with the Serbian SuperLiga champions.

In July 2013 some rumors in Iran had it that he was about to sign a contract with Esteghlal, having lost its pivotal midfielder Mojtaba Jabbari a few days back, the management of the Iranian club was under tremendous pressure to hire a competent replacement. Lovre also was in trial with Esteghlal in January 2013 but he was not confirmed by the club head coach Amir Ghalenoei. Finally, he joined to the team on 21 July 2013 with signing a one-year contract.

In February 2014, he joined the German fourth division club SSV Ulm 1846.

International career
Lovre won a silver medal with the Serbia and Montenegro U-21 team at the UEFA European Championship in 2004. In the same year, he was also a part of the Serbia and Montenegro U-23 team that participated at the Summer Olympics, when they exited in the group stage.

Career statistics

References

External links
 Goran Lovre at vi.nl
 Goran Lovre at fcgstats.nl
 

1982 births
Living people
Footballers from Zagreb
Serbs of Croatia
Serbian footballers
Association football midfielders
Serbia and Montenegro under-21 international footballers
Olympic footballers of Serbia and Montenegro
Footballers at the 2004 Summer Olympics
Serbian SuperLiga players
Belgian Pro League players
Eredivisie players
English Football League players
FK Partizan players
R.S.C. Anderlecht players
FC Groningen players
Barnsley F.C. players
Esteghlal F.C. players
Serbian expatriate footballers
Serbian expatriate sportspeople in Belgium
Expatriate footballers in Belgium
Serbian expatriate sportspeople in the Netherlands
Expatriate footballers in the Netherlands
Serbian expatriate sportspeople in England
Expatriate footballers in England
Serbian expatriate sportspeople in Iran
Expatriate footballers in Iran